The Mayor of Wilmington is the chief executive of the government of Wilmington, Delaware, as stipulated by the Charter. The current Mayor of Wilmington is Mike Purzycki.

City of Wilmington

Borough of Wilmington

See also
 Timeline of Wilmington, Delaware
 List of governors of Delaware
 List of lieutenant governors of Delaware
 List of United States senators from Delaware
 List of United States representatives from Delaware

References

External links
 Office of the Mayor

Wilmington, Delaware
Wilmington, Delaware

1832 establishments in Delaware